The Xindian River (or Xindian Creek) is a river in northern Taiwan.

Overview
The Xindian River is one of the three major tributaries into the Tamsui River. The Feitsui Dam spans the Beishi southeast of Taipei. It flows west past Xindian before merging with the Nanshi River; it is at this point that it becomes "Xindian River". It then turns north and merges with the Jingmei River, before finally merging with the Dahan River and feeding into the Tamsui River.

The river is one of the main sources for drinking water in Taipei City. According to the Taipei City Running Water Center, over 4 million Taipei residents obtain 97% of their drinking water from the river. Today, there are 22 bridges that span the river.

Pollution 
The Xindian River is heavily polluted by both raw sewage and industrial pollution from illegal industry.

  The natural watercourse restoration is on the agenda of the Taipei City Government, Taiwan Central Government and several citizen organizations.

See also
 Tamsui River
 Feitsui Dam
 List of rivers of Taiwan

References

External links

Taipei travel

Rivers of Taiwan
Landforms of New Taipei
Landforms of Taipei